Methomyl is a carbamate insecticide introduced in 1966.  It is highly toxic to humans, livestock, pets, and wildlife.
The EU and UK imposed a pesticide residue limit of 20 µg/kg for apples and oranges.

Methomyl is a common active ingredient in commercial fly bait, for which the label instructions in the United States warn that "It is a violation of Federal Law to use this product in a manner inconsistent with its labeling." "Off-label" uses and other uses not specifically targeted at problem insects are illegal, dangerous, and ill-advised.

Use

Methomyl is a broad-spectrum insecticide that is used to kill insect pests. Methomyl is registered for commercial/professional use under certain conditions on sites including field, vegetable, and orchard crops; turf (sod
farms only); livestock quarters; commercial premises; and refuse containers. Products containing 1% Methomyl are available to the general public for retail sale, but more potent formulations are classified as restricted-use pesticides: not registered for homeowner or non-professional application. However, Heliothis virescens developed a resistance to methomyl within 5 years. Other species like Helicoverpa assulta also developed resistance after exposure.

Trade names

Common names for methomyl include metomil and mesomile. Trade names include , Agrinate, DuPont 1179, Flytek, Kipsin, Lannate, Lanox, Memilene, Methavin, Methomex, Nudrin, NuBait, Pillarmate and SD 14999

Toxicity
In acute toxicity testing, methomyl is placed in EPA Toxicity Category I (the highest toxicity category out of four) via the oral route and in eye irritation studies. It is in lower Toxicity Categories for inhalation (Category II), acute dermal effects (Category III), and acute skin irritation (Category IV). Methomyl is not likely to be a carcinogen (EPA carcinogen Category E).

Ecotoxicity
Methomyl has low persistence in the soil environment, with a reported half-life of approximately 14 days. Because of its high solubility in water, and low affinity for soil binding methomyl may have potential for groundwater contamination. The estimated aqueous half-life for the insecticide is 6 days in surface water and over 25 weeks in groundwater.

Synthesis

First prepare thioester

Second prepare oxime from thioester

Third prepare product from methyl isocyanate and the finished oxime.

References

External links
 

Acetylcholinesterase inhibitors
Carbamate insecticides
Endocrine disruptors
Oxime carbamates